John William Servos (b. 1951) is an American professor and historian of science.  His research centers on the historical development of science as a discourse and in the form of institutions and on how science has situated itself historically in the culture at large.

Servos is the Anson D. Morse Professor of History at Amherst College, a Fellow of the American Association for the Advancement of Science, and past President (2002–2003) of the History of Science Society.

His book, Physical Chemistry from Ostwald to Pauling, received the History of Science Society's Pfizer Award for best book in the history of science in 1991.
  
He received his B.A. from Columbia College, Columbia University in 1972, his  and his Ph.D. from The Johns Hopkins University in 1979.

Selected works

Articles

Books 
 Servos, John W., Physical chemistry from Ostwald to Pauling : the making of a science in America, Princeton, N.J. : Princeton University Press, 1990. 
 Crossley, Pamela Kyle; Lees, Lynn Hollen; Servos, John W., Global society : the world since 1900, Boston : Houghton Mifflin, 2004.

References 

American historians of science
1951 births
Living people
Fellows of the American Association for the Advancement of Science
21st-century American historians
21st-century American male writers
Columbia College (New York) alumni
American male non-fiction writers
Johns Hopkins University alumni